Nirooye Havaei Football Club is an Iranian football club based in Tehran, Iran. It is the football team of Iran's Islamic Republic of Iran Air Force.

In the 1950s, it was among the top three football clubs of the country.

1956 Tehran Hazfi Cup
During the 1956 Tehran Hazfi Cup, Nirooye Havaei had defeated Taj SC in the semi-final, however the result was nullified because Nirooye Havaei had used a foreign player in the match. The game was replayed many times, the first rematch ending 1–1, the second rematch ended 3–3 and the third rematch ended in a 3–1 defeat to Taj SC, Nirooye Havaei thus missing out on reaching the final.

Honors

Tehran Football Championship:
 Runner Up: 1951–1952, 1952–1953

References

Football clubs in Iran
Sport in Tehran